Mueang Phang Nga is the capital district (amphoe mueang) of Phang Nga province in southern Thailand.

Geography
Neighboring districts are (from the east clockwise): Thap Put and Phanom of Surat Thani province; Kapong, Thai Mueang, and Takua Thung of Phang Nga. To the south is Phang Nga Bay, with the insular district Ko Yao.

Ao Phang Nga National Park covers the islands south of the district. Sa Nang Manora Forest Park protects 0.29 km2 of the Khao Toy Nang Hong Forest around the Sa Nang Manora waterfall. The Ton Pariwat Wildlife Sanctuary in the north of the district is under construction. There are also several caves within the limestone hills.

Administration
The district is divided into nine sub-districts (tambons), which are further subdivided into 42 villages (mubans). Phang Nga itself is a town (thesaban mueang) and covers tambon Thai Chang. There are a further seven tambon administrative organizations (TAO).

See also
Khao Chang

External links

Tourist attractions, Phang Nga Provincial website 

Mueang Phang Nga